The 2016–17 Penn Quakers men's basketball team represented the University of Pennsylvania during the 2016–17 NCAA Division I men's basketball season. The Quakers, led by second-year head coach Steve Donahue, played their home games at The Palestra and were members of the Ivy League. They finished the season 13–15, 6–8 in Ivy League play to finish in fourth place. They lost in the semifinals of the inaugural Ivy League tournament to Princeton.

Previous season 
The Quakers finished the 2015–16 season 11–17, 5–9 in Ivy League play to finish in fifth place.

Offseason

Departures

Incoming transfers

2016 recruiting class

2017 recruiting class

Roster

Schedule and results

|-
!colspan=9 style=| Regular season

|-
!colspan=9 style=| Ivy League tournament

References

Penn Quakers men's basketball seasons
Penn
Penn
Penn